SM City Legazpi is a shopping mall owned and operated by SM Prime Holdings, the largest retail and mall operator in the Philippines. It is located along Imelda C. Roces Avenue corner Terminal Road, Barangay Bitano, Legazpi City, Albay. Opened on September 14, 2018, it is the first SM Supermall in Albay and the second in the Bicol Region following SM City Naga. It is also the 71st SM Supermall in the Philippines after SM City Telabastagan in San Fernando, Pampanga.

History 
In 2015, the city government of Legazpi City announced that SM Prime Holdings is planning to build an SM Supermalls branch in the city. Legazpi Mayor Noel E. Rosal disclosed in a news report that SM Prime Holdings had earmarked Php1 billion for the new shopping mall. Subsequent news reports revealed that SM will spend Php1.5 billion for the new shopping center. In late 2016, SM presented the design of the new mall.

The groundbreaking ceremony for the mall was held on February 22, 2017, and construction began immediately after. The jeepney terminal and retail complex of the LKY Metro Transport and Lifestyle Hub, including the SM Savemore, were relocated to give way to the construction. In anticipation of possible traffic congestion, alternate roads leading to the new mall  are also being planned, according to Mayor Rosal. The mall is expected to generate 4,000 jobs.

The blessing and inaugural sale was held on September 13, 2018, attended by local officials and SM Supermalls officials led by SM Chairman for Executive Committee Hans T. Sy Sr. The mall was officially opened on September 14, 2018, with 85% of its space already lease-awarded.

Mall features 
SM City Legazpi is a three-level shopping mall with green architecture features. The floor plan follows a z-shaped layout with provisions for natural daylight. Distinct mall features include a glass-walled Food Hall with outdoor balcony and an SM Prestige Lounge, both with panoramic views of Mt. Mayon. The mall also has a 922-slot three-level parking area with roof deck parking and six digital cinemas with 109 comfort seats per theater.  Additional facilities include a customer service hub, PWD access ramps, and breastfeeding station. It is a typhoon-resilient structure, according to Annie Garcia, President of SM Supermalls.

Tenants 

SM City Legazpi is anchored by The SM Store and SM Supermarket. It also has SM Supermalls junior anchors and retail affiliates such as SM Appliance Center, Our Home, Watsons, Cyberzone, ACE Hardware, BDO, Uniqlo, Surplus Shop, National Book Store, Sports Central, Bata Shoes, The Face Shop, The Body Shop, and Miniso. The mall has more than 150 stores including a mix of local, national, and international retail brands, restaurants, and service vendors.

Location 

SM City Legazpi is located on a five-hectare property along Imelda C. Roces Avenue (formerly Tahao Road) in the Legazpi Port District approximately 1.5 kilometers from the Legazpi City Hall and 2.3 kilometers from the Legazpi Airport. The mall is located near a former SM Savemore, and is adjacent to the Legazpi Grand Central Terminal and the Ibalong Centrum for Recreation.

Gallery

See also 
Ayala Malls Legazpi
Yashano Mall
SM City Naga

References

External links 
SM Supermalls - Official Website
SM City Legazpi on Facebook

Buildings and structures in Legazpi, Albay
Shopping malls in Legazpi, Albay
Shopping malls in the Philippines
SM Prime
Shopping malls established in 2018
Shopping malls in Bicol Region